Ben-Ami Shillony (born October 28, 1937 (?), Poland) is professor emeritus of Japanese history at the Hebrew University of Jerusalem.

Selected publications 
 Revolt in Japan. Princeton University Press, 1973. Translated into Japanese: Nihon no hanran, Kawade Shobō Shinsha, 1975.
 Politics and Culture in Wartime Japan. Clarendon Press, Oxford, 1981. Paperback edition Oxford University Press, 1991. Translated into Japanese: Uotaimu japan, Gogatsu Shobō, 1991.
 Yapan hamesoratit: tarbut ve-historia. Schocken Publishing House, 1995. Revised and expanded edition, 2001.
 Yapan hamodernit: tarbut ve-historia. Schocken Publishing House, 1997. Revised and expanded edition, 2002.
 The Jews and the Japanese. Charles E. Tuttle, 1992. Translated into Japanese: Yudayajin to nihonjin no fushigina kankei, Seikō Shobō, 2004.
 Collected Writings of Ben-Ami Shillony. Japan Library, Curzon Press, 2000.
 Enigma of the Emperors: Sacred Subservience in Japanese History. Global Oriental, 2005. Translated into Japanese: Haha naru tennō, Kōdansha, 2003.
 The Emperors of Modern Japan. Brill, 2008. (Editor)
 Yapan bemabat ishi. Schocken Publishing House, Tel Aviv, 2011.

References 

1937 births
Living people
Historians of Japan
Israeli Japanologists
Academic staff of the Hebrew University of Jerusalem
Recipients of the Order of the Sacred Treasure
Members of the Israel Academy of Sciences and Humanities
Israeli people of Polish-Jewish descent
Israeli expatriates in Japan